Kamlesh Thakor (Koli) (born 19 September 1992) is an Indian cricketer. He made his List A debut on 27 February 2014, for Gujarat in the 2013–14 Vijay Hazare Trophy. He made his first-class debut for Gujarat in the 2017–18 Ranji Trophy on 25 November 2017.

References

External links
 

1992 births
Living people
Indian cricketers
Place of birth missing (living people)
Gujarat cricketers